The western concert flute family has a wide range of instruments.

Piccolo

The piccolo is the highest-pitched member of the flute family, with a range an octave above that of the concert flute. It is usually the highest-pitched instrument within orchestras and bands. The piccolo has a stereotype for being difficult to play in tune; its small size makes it difficult to construct an evenly tuned scale.

Treble flute

The treble flute is pitched in the key of G, a fifth above the concert flute. The instrument is rare today, only occasionally found in flute choirs or private collections.

Soprano flute

This distinctive sounding instrument is rarely found at present. A few American publications for flute choir currently include a part for an E (soprano) flute, an instrument pitched a minor third higher than the standard C flute. In these publications, an alternative part is provided either for the C flute or for the piccolo.

Concert flute

The standard concert flute, also called C flute, Boehm flute, silver flute, or simply flute, is by far the most common member of the flute family. The flute is used in many ensembles including concert bands, orchestras, flute ensembles, occasionally jazz bands and big bands.

The instrument is pitched in C and has a range of just over three octaves starting from the musical note C4 (corresponding to middle C on the piano), however, some experienced flautists are able to reach C8. Many professional flutes have a longer B-foot joint, which can reach B3.

Flûte d'amour

The flûte d'amour or flauto d'amore is pitched in A, A, or B and is intermediate in size between the modern C concert flute and the alto flute in G. It is the mezzo-soprano, tenor or countertenor member of the flute family. It is sometimes referred to as a tenor flute. The range of the instrument is from G3 to E7. The B version is usually used for jazz because both the tenor saxophone and clarinet are in B.

Alto flute

The alto flute is characterized by its distinct, mellow tone in the lower portion of its range. The tube of the alto flute is considerably thicker and longer than a C flute and requires more breath from the player. However, this gives it a greater dynamic presence in the bottom octave and a half of its range. It is pitched in the key of G (sounding a fourth lower than written) with its range stretching from G3 to G6. The headjoint may be straight or curved.

Bass flute

The bass flute is pitched in the key of C, and one octave below the concert flute. Because of the length of its tube (approximately ), it is usually made with a curved headjoint, sometimes in a "J" shape, to bring the embouchure hole within reach of the player. It is usually only used in flute choirs, as it is easily drowned out by other instruments of comparable register, such as the clarinet.

Contra-alto flute

The contra-alto flute (also called contrabass flute in G) is in the key of G, pitched one octave below the alto flute, and a fourth below the bass flute. It is so large that the instrument's body is held vertically, with an adjustable floor peg similar to that of the bass clarinet.

Contrabass flute

The contrabass flute (sometimes also called octobass flute) is used mostly in flute ensembles. Its range is similar to that of the regular concert flute, except that it is pitched two octaves lower; the lowest performable note is C2 (equivalent to the lowest C on the cello). Many contrabass flutes in C are also equipped with a low B1 (in the same manner as many modern standard sized flutes are). The contra-alto flute is sometimes referred to as a contrabass flute in G.

Subcontrabass flute

The subcontrabass flute is pitched either in the key of G, a fourth below the contrabass flute in C and two octaves below the alto flute in G, or in F, a fifth below the contrabass flute. It is sometimes called the double contra-alto flute.

Double contrabass flute

The double contrabass flute (sometimes also called octobass flute) is pitched in the key of C, three octaves below the concert flute (two octaves below the bass flute, and one octave below the contrabass flute). Its lowest note is C1, one octave below the cello's lowest C. Despite the tendency of the larger sizes of flute to be quiet, the double contrabass flute has a surprisingly powerful tone, though it benefits from amplification in ensembles.

Hyperbass flute

The hyperbass flute is the largest and lowest instrument in the flute family. It is pitched in C, four octaves below the concert flute (and three octaves below the bass flute, two octaves below the contrabass flute, and one octave below the double contrabass flute). The only known example of the instrument is a prototype built for Italian flautist Roberto Fabbriciani by Francesco Romei, a Florentine craftsman.

Side-blown flutes